The 2011 Sri Lanka Premier League was a postponed Twenty20 cricket league. It was scheduled as the first edition of the new Twenty20 domestic cricket competition in Sri Lanka, from 19 July to 4 August. It was postponed until 2012, which was held as the 2012 Sri Lanka Premier League, after problems due to allegations of corruption and incompetence by Sri Lanka Cricket. The Board of Control for Cricket in India had also decided not to allow Indian players to play in the tournament.

The proposed tournament included seven teams representing the provinces of Sri Lanka. The teams were to be captained by six national captains and a former Sri Lanka vice-captain. The tournament was to feature over 30 international cricketers and be the first of its kind in Sri Lanka.

Teams
Unlike other cricket leagues, the Sri Lanka Premier League did not have city-based teams but instead provincial teams to allow an entire province to associate themselves with a team and thus create a bigger following for the tournament. Seven teams were established in seven provinces, with three being created in 2011. Aside from the Nagenahira Nagas and the Uthura Oryxes, each of these teams played in a previous Inter-Provincial tournament. North Central and Sabaragamuwa Provinces did not have teams for the first season. Teams for all the provinces were limited to ensure competitiveness for the future.

Venue
All of the matches in the tournament were to be played at R Premadasa Stadium, Colombo.

Squads
Captains
A few teams had a Sri Lankan captain, Sanath Jayasuriya (Ruhuna), Mahela Jayawardene (Wayamba), Kumar Sangakkara (Kandurata) and Tillakaratne Dilshan (Basnahira); for Nagenahira and Uthura, Pakistan former captain Shahid Afridi and New Zealand former skipper Daniel Vettori have been chosen respectively. The league will featured almost 35 international cricketing stars and was the first of its kind in Sri Lanka.

Team composition rules
Each team:
 will have a total squad sizes between 16 and 18 players.
 is allowed to have five overseas players, but only four will be allowed to play in a match.
 will have a minimum seven Sri Lankan players, with one player being an under-21 cricketer.
 will have icon or marquee players, as well as a prominent ex-Sri Lanka player as a mentor or coach.

Sri Lankan national selectors and cricket authorities agreed to blood as many youngsters and almost 70 Sri Lankan cricketers would be registered in the seven team tournament. Almost all Pakistani national cricketers were invited to play in the SLPL. In addition to that International stars like Chris Gayle and the Bravo brothers (Dwayne and Darren), Herschelle Gibbs, David Warner, Lonwabo Tsotsobe, Kevin O'Brien, Daniel Christian, Kieron Pollard, Daniel Vettori and Shaun Tait would have been seen in action on Sri Lankan soil. Salaries would have been lower than the IPL, with the highest at $30,000, with Shahid Afridi getting $35,000. Shoaib Akhtar was also included among the international players who are take parting in SLPL. But Later on he has decided to pull out of SLPL due to personal reasons.

International players that were expected to play

 Shaun Tait
 Callum Ferguson
 David Warner
 Daniel Christian
 Tamim Iqbal
 Shakib Al Hasan
 Shafiul Islam
 Mohammad Ashraful
 Kevin O'Brien
 Daniel Vettori
 Umar Akmal
 Shahid Afridi
 Abdul Razzaq
 Imran Nazir
 Mohammad Sami
 Umar Gul
 Sohail Tanvir
 Wahab Riaz
 Misbah-ul-Haq
 Albie Morkel
 Herschelle Gibbs
 Lonwabo Tsotsobe
 Makhaya Ntini
 Chris Gayle
 Darren Bravo
 Kieron Pollard

Indian players who were barred from playing

 Manish Pandey
 Manoj Tiwary
 Paul Valthaty
 Ravindra Jadeja
 Saurabh Tiwary
 Umesh Yadav
 Vinay Kumar
 Yuvraj Singh
 Yusuf Pathan
 Munaf Patel
 Ravichandran Ashwin

Fixtures

Semi-finals

Final

Media coverage
All 24 matches were planned to be telecast live to every cricketing nation.

References

External links
 Tournament page – Cricinfo

Sri Lanka Premier League
Sri Lanka Premier League
2011 in Sri Lankan cricket